Audrain may refer to:

Ashley Audrain (born 1982), Canadian author
François Audrain, French singer and songwriter
James Hunter Audrain (1781–1831), colonel of militia in War of 1812 and member of Missouri state legislature  
Audrain County, Missouri, county in Missouri, United States
USS Audrain (APA-59),  United States Navy Gilliam class attack transport that served during World War II

See also 
 Adrain
 Adrian (disambiguation)